is a Japanese pop singer and songwriter. Since the release of her million-selling single "Romance no Kamisama" in 1993, Hirose has recorded music for winter-sporting goods company Alpen's advertising campaigns.

Biography
After returning from America, her first album "Bingo!" was released in July 1992, but the first big hit for her was her third single, released in December 1993, "Romance no Kamisama", which sold 1.75 million copies. Subsequent album and single releases around that time of year, as well as her sponsorship deal with the skiing goods company Alpen to write songs for their winter-time commercials, earned her the title of the "Winter Queen", and this was reinforced with the single "Gelaende ga Tokeru Hodo Koishitai" in December 1995. Her 1998 compilation of these singles, The Best "Love Winters", is certified multi-million, having sold 2.4 million copies.

She hosts a weekly show on Ustream.tv called "Friday Kohmi". In 2011, she released "Egao no Megamisama" to the iTunes Store to raise money for the recovery from the 2011 Tōhoku earthquake and tsunami, using 120 viewers of her show to form the chorus. For her 20th anniversary in 2012, Hirose released a compilation album titled Single Collection and an English language cover album of Christmas songs titled Love X'mas, working with Jun Abe, Satori Shiraishi, Yuji Toriyama, and Takeshi Nakatsuka to arrange it. She also embarked on a 3-stop anniversary tour called "Happy & Smile ～Super Best Selection～", with concerts at the Zepp Tokyo, Nagoya, and Osaka halls.

In 2022, Hirose participated as a guest artist at the annual touring show Fantasy on Ice in Makuhari and Nagoya. She performed the show opening to the song "Gelaende ga Tokeru Hodo Koishitai" and the finale to "Romance no Kamisama" amongst others.

Discography

Album 
 Bingo! (1992.07.22)
 "good luck!" (1993.03.24)
 Success Story (1993.12.16)
 Fuji TV's Drama "Ue o muite aruko" Original Soundtrack (1994.5.21)
 Harvest (1994.12.16)
 Beginning Part 2 (1995.06.21)
 Love Together (1995.12.16)
 welcome-musik (1997.02.05)
 Movie "Tokimeki Memorial" original soundtrack (1997.08.08)
 Thousands of Covers Disc1 (1997.08.21)
 rhapsody (1998.01.15)
 The Best "Love Winters" (1998.11.11)
 Music D. (1999.12.16)
 Hirose Kohmi The Best Love Winters: Ballads (2001.11.07)
 Lovebird (2004.12.16)
 Musical "Hakuja-den/ White Lovers" song selection (as sound director - 2006.11.08)
 Gift＋ (2006.11.22)
 THE Best Love Winters & Ballads (2007.02.21)
 Alpen Best (2007.12.05)
 Thousands of Covers (2008.03.26) (re-release of 1997.08.21 issue)
 Making My Life Better (2008.12.03)
 Tie-Up Collection ~Hirose Kohmi no Terebi de Kiita Ano Kyokutachi~ (2009.12.16)
 Drama Songs (2010.01.20)
 Meikyoku Album (2010.12.15)
 Single Collection (2011.11.23)
 Love X'mas (2011.11.23)
 And.Love.Again. (2012.12.5)
  Winter High: The Best of Kohmi's Party  (2014.12.3)
  25th Playlist  (2016.11.2)
  THE BEST 1992 - 2018  (2019.1.23)
  WINTER TOUR 2020 SING  (2019.11.27)
  Admiral's Good Time  (2020)
  ME SINGING YOU SINGING  (2021.1.27)
  Kohmi30 '' (2022.11.30)

Singles 
Asterisks indicate songs performed for Alpen, Co.
  (1992.12.02)
  (1993.05.21)
  (1993.12.01)*
  (1994.05.11)
  (1995.05.24)*
  (1995.05.24)
  (1995.12.01)*
 "DEAR...again" (1996.11.11)*
  (1997.01.01)*
  (1997.07.24)
 "promise" (1997.11.27)*
  (1998.01.15)*
 "Groovy!" (1998.09.23)
  (1998.12.02)*
 "I Wish" (1999.01.21)*
  (1999.11.20)*
  (2000.01.13)*
  (2000.03.23)
 "More More Love Winters" (2000.11.22) (maxi re-mix single)*
 "Search-Light" (2001.01.24)*
  (2001.09.21)
 "Velvet" (2001.12.05)*
  (2002.01.23)*
  (2004.11.17)
  (2006.02.15)
  (2009.12.16)*
 Straight ni Suki to Io (2013.12.20)*
 Hoero Lions (70th Anniversary) (2020.06.19)
 Further Symmetry (2021.01.19)
 KIMI NI SERENADE (2022.01.15)
 Venus Line (2022.04.06)
 Premium World (2022.11.23)

Video/DVD 
 Hirose Kohmi The Video Love Winters (10 video clips - 2000.12.06)
 Hirose Kohmi The Live Winter Collection 2001-2002 (live footage from 2001/2002 concert tour - 2002.03.21)
 Tour 2007 Gift+ Shiawase wa Fuyu ni Yattekuru (live footage from 2007 concert tour - 2007.12.05)

References

External links 
 

1966 births
20th-century Japanese composers
20th-century Japanese pianists
20th-century Japanese women singers
20th-century Japanese singers
20th-century women composers
21st-century Japanese composers
21st-century Japanese pianists
21st-century Japanese women singers
21st-century Japanese singers
21st-century women composers
Anime composers
Anime musicians
Japanese women composers
Japanese women pop singers
Japanese women singer-songwriters
Japanese lyricists
Japanese-language singers
Japanese pianists
Japanese record producers
Japanese women pianists
Japanese women record producers
Kunitachi College of Music alumni
Living people
Musicians from Fukuoka Prefecture
People from Chikushino, Fukuoka
Victor Entertainment artists
Fantasy on Ice guest artists
20th-century women pianists
21st-century women pianists